Haemaphysalis intermedia, the flat-inner-spurred haemaphysalid, is a hard-bodied tick of the genus Haemaphysalis. It is found in India and Sri Lanka. It is an obligate ectoparasite of mammals. It is a potential vector of Kyasanur Forest disease virus, Ganjam virus, and Nairobi sheep disease virus.

Parasitism
Adults parasitize various wild and domestic mammals. Ticks can be controlled by using cypermethrin.

References

External links
Ganjam virus: a new arbovirus isolated from ticks Haemaphysalis intermedia Warburton and Nuttall, 1909 in Orissa, India.
Redescription of Cotypes and All Stages of Haemaphysalis intermedia Warburton and Nuttall, 1909 (= H. parva Neumann, 1908, Preoccupied) from Ceylon and India (Ixodoidea, Ixodidae)

Ticks
Ixodidae
Animals described in 1909